Big Basin Redwoods State Park is a state park in the U.S. state of California, located in Santa Cruz County, about  northwest of Santa Cruz. The park contains almost all of the Waddell Creek watershed, which was formed by the seismic uplift of its rim, and the erosion of its center by the many streams in its bowl-shaped depression.

Big Basin is California's oldest State Park, established in 1902, earning its designation as a California Historical Landmark. It is part of the Northern California coastal forests ecoregion and is home to the largest continuous stand of ancient coast redwoods south of San Francisco. It contains  of old-growth forest as well as recovering redwood forest, with mixed conifer, oaks, chaparral and riparian habitats. Elevations in the park vary from sea level to over 600 m (2,000 ft). The climate ranges from foggy and damp near the ocean to sunny, warm ridge tops.

Some of these trails link Big Basin to Castle Rock State Park and the eastern reaches of the Santa Cruz range. The Skyline-to-the-Sea Trail threads its way through the park along Waddell Creek to Waddell Beach and the adjacent Theodore J. Hoover Natural Preserve, a freshwater marsh.

The park has many waterfalls, a wide variety of environments (from lush canyon bottoms to sparse chaparral-covered slopes), many animals (deer, raccoons, an occasional bobcat) and abundant bird life – including Steller's jays, egrets, herons and acorn woodpeckers.

In August 2020, the visitor center and headquarters were destroyed in the CZU Lightning Complex fires. After the fires, the park remained closed to the public until July 22, 2022 when parts of the park were reopened.

History 

Archaeological evidence has sporadically found prehistoric people inhabited old growth forests  within the Park. Numerous resources would have been available to California Indians in the old growth forests, such as basketry material, plant foods like acorns and bulbs as well as animal prey for hunters and perhaps traditional sacred places. Ohlone tribes that lived on watercourses which begin in the park were the Quiroste, Achistaca, Cotoni and Sayante. In October 1769, the Portola expedition encountered the redwoods of southern Santa Cruz County, and camped at the mouth of Waddell Creek, in present-day Big Basin, later that month. Although many in the party had been ill with scurvy, they gorged themselves on berries and quickly recovered. This miraculous recovery, as it seemed at the time, inspired the name given to the valley: 'Cañada de la Salud' or Canyon of Health.

By the late 19th century, redwood forests were gaining international appreciation. Early conservationists, including such notables as Andrew P. Hill, Robert Kenna, John J. Montgomery, Carrie Stevens Walter and Josephine Clifford McCracken, led the movement to create a park to preserve the redwoods. On May 19, 1900, the Sempervirens Club was formed at the base of Slippery Rock, within the present day park.

In the following decades, visitation to Big Basin grew steadily as park amenities were developed. The Big Basin Inn offered cabins to rent, a restaurant, general store, barber shop, gas station and photographic studio. There were also a post office, a concrete swimming pool, boating areas, tennis courts and a dance floor. Campsites cost 50 cents a night in 1927 and many families stayed all summer. During the Great Depression of the 1930s, the Civilian Conservation Corps assigned a company to Big Basin. These men built the amphitheater, miles of trails, and many of the buildings still used today.  The main administration building, built by the CCC in 1936, is listed on the National Register of Historic Places.

Save the Redwoods League purchased a  parcel known as Cascade Creek in 2020 that links Big Basin with Año Nuevo State Park.

2020 California wildfires 
The park was badly affected by the CZU Lightning Complex fires in August 2020, and was evacuated on August 18.  According to NASA FIRMS data, the fire impacted the core of the park on August 19.  On August 20, it was reported that the park's historic headquarters building had been "almost completely destroyed" and the entire core and campgrounds of the park had been extensively damaged. A few redwoods had also fallen during the fires, though the majority of the ancient redwoods remained standing. A fire previously raged in the Big Basin in 1904. An April 2021 backcountry tour revealed Spring budding amidst the scorched landscape and the hundred structures destroyed, and the park superintendent estimated it might be up to a year before the public will be allowed safe access to park trails. One year after the fire, the burnt wreckage of 1,490 structures and 15,000 charred trees, mainly Douglas fir, which had fallen or in danger of falling onto the hiking trails, were removed and rebuilding planning was able to begin.

Flora 
 
Although redwoods dominate the landscape, many other plant species are common in Big Basin. One will certainly see coast Douglas-fir, tan oak and Pacific madrone, Pacific wax myrtle trees in the park. Competing for sunshine are also many shrubs such as red huckleberries, western azalea, and many varieties of ferns. Spring and summer bring the wildflowers: redwood sorrel, salal, redwood violets, trillium, star lily and mountain iris. The rains of fall and winter deliver hundreds of kinds of fungi in a startling variety of shapes, sizes and colors.

Upon climbing to higher elevations, one will find the forest growing thinner, as redwoods are replaced by more drought-tolerant species. The higher, drier ridges and slopes of Big Basin are typically full of chaparral vegetation: knobcone pines, chinquapin and buckeye create the canopy, with ceanothus, manzanita, chamise, and chaparral pea growing dense and low. Adding a splash of color are wildflowers such as Indian paintbrush, monkey flower, bush poppies and yerba santa.

Near the mouth of Waddell Creek is the Theodore J. Hoover Natural Preserve, a freshwater marsh that is rare because it has been relatively undisturbed. This special place provides habitat for a wide variety of birds, reptiles and amphibians. The nearby Rancho Del Oso Nature and History Center interprets the cultural and natural history of the area.

Fauna 

Mammals such as black-tailed deer, western gray squirrels, chipmunks and raccoons are common, but foxes, coyotes, bobcats, and opossums are also present. Cougars are known to live in the park but are rarely sighted. Grizzly bears are extinct in California, but were numerous in the past.  The last known human to die in California due to a grizzly attack in the wild occurred in Big Basin when, in 1875, William Waddell, a lumber mill owner, was killed near Waddell Creek.

Bird life is abundant throughout the park. Steller's jays and acorn woodpeckers are both seen and heard, and the dark-eyed junco is widespread. Less obvious are the brown creeper, Anna's hummingbird, northern flicker, olive-sided flycatcher and sharp-shinned hawk. The first marbled murrelet nest ever sighted was located in Big Basin not far from the park headquarters. These robin-sized seabirds nest high in the oldest coast Douglas-firs and redwoods to feed their young. They can be seen or heard at dawn and dusk, high above the forest canopy.

Many reptiles are also present, but aside from the ubiquitous Coast Range subspecies of the western fence lizard (Sceloporus occidentalis bocourtii), most are rarely seen due to their shy behavior. The only dangerous reptile in the park is the Pacific rattlesnake (Crotalus oreganus), found almost exclusively in the high, dry chaparral.

The damp, shady woodland floor is home to a variety of amphibians. Commonly seen species include the California newt (Taricha torosa torosa), Pacific tree frog (Pseudacris regilla), and arboreal salamander (Aneides lugubris). Less commonly seen are the black salamander (Aneides flavipunctatus) and California giant salamander (Dicamptodon ensatus) and the threatened California red-legged frog (Rana draytonii). Particularly intriguing are banana slugs (Ariolimax spp.), which can reach 6 inches long.

The butterfly, California sisters (Adelpha bredowii), flutter high in the tree canopies.

Camping 
Big Basin Redwoods State Park has many options for camping, including cabins, developed campsites, and trail camps. Within the park, there are 146 individual campsites, 36 cabins, and five trail camps. Campers are allowed to bring dogs to their campsites, provided the dogs are leashed. Dogs are not allowed in trail camps.

Each campground at Big Basin Redwoods State Park is open on a different schedule during the year. The Huckleberry and Sequoia Campgrounds are open year round while Blooms Creek, Sempervirens, Watashi and Sky Meadow Campgrounds are seasonal.

Big Basin Redwoods State Park has five backcountry trail camps, which require permits to use. Some of the campsites are on the Skyline-to-the-Sea trail and can be used on the hike with proper permissions.

Access 

The park is about two hours south of San Francisco, or seven hours north of Los Angeles.

Big Basin can be approached from the east, through redwood forest and coastal mountains, or from the coast, along State Route 1. The eastern route, over State Route 9 through Saratoga and smaller towns like Boulder Creek is more popular because of the famous trees. This route passes Castle Rock State Park (California) on the eastern side of the Santa Cruz range.

From SR 1, Gazos Creek road offers a pleasant fire-road route for mountain bikes (road closed to motor vehicles), which can then descend into the headquarters area or turn off on Johansen fire road to join China Grade above its intersection with State Route 236.

After reopening the park after the CZU Lightning Complex fires, the Santa Cruz Metropolitan Transit District expanded its bus route 35 service to run four trips to and from the park on weekends only.

In popular culture 
Big Basin plays the part of the fictional "Bolderoc National Park" in the 1942 George Marshall film, The Forest Rangers. It also stands in for Muir Woods in the 1958 Alfred Hitchcock film, Vertigo and for Redwood National Park in the 1967 Disney film, The Gnome-Mobile.

See also 
 List of California state parks

References

Further reading

External links 

 
 California State Parks: Big Basin Redwoods State Park website
Hikingsanfrancisco.com: Big Basin Hiking

Gallery

State parks of California
Parks in Santa Cruz County, California
Coast redwood groves
Santa Cruz Mountains
Campgrounds in California
Parks in the San Francisco Bay Area
Protected areas established in 1902
1902 establishments in California
Civilian Conservation Corps in California
Old-growth forests